Anders Jan-Erik Sjöberg (born 14 September 1946) is a former Swedish footballer. He made 173 Allsvenskan appearances for Djurgårdens IF and scored 16 goals.

Honours

Club 

 Djurgårdens IF 
 Allsvenskan: 1966

References

Swedish footballers
Sweden international footballers
Sweden youth international footballers
Allsvenskan players
Djurgårdens IF Fotboll players
Landskrona BoIS players
1946 births
Living people
Association football midfielders